Alysidiidae is a family of bryozoans belonging to the order Cheilostomatida.

Genera:
 Alysidium Busk, 1852
 Catenicula O'Donoghue, 1924

References

Bryozoan families